Georgiy Roedov (1 March 1939 – 14 November 2021) was a Russian diplomat. He served as Ambassador of the Soviet Union and later Russia to Laos from 1990 to 1993 and Ambassador of Russia to Kyrgyzstan from 1997 to 2002.

References

1939 births
2021 deaths
Soviet diplomats
Russian diplomats
Ambassador Extraordinary and Plenipotentiary (Russian Federation)
Ambassadors of the Soviet Union to Laos
Ambassadors of Russia to Laos
Ambassadors of Russia to Kyrgyzstan
People from Turkistan Region